C. T. Abdurahim (Malayalam:സി.ടി. അബ്ദുറഹിം) is a writer, religious scholar and educator.

Life and work

In 1982 he left Qatar and came back to India and with the help of friends, set-up Dayapuram Educational and Cultural Centre. For the last 31 years, he has been coming to Dayapuram everyday including on Sundays and working on improving the quality of this organization.

Publications 
 Indiacharithrathinte Randu Mughangal (Two Faces of Indian History, 1971)
 Mathavum Yukthivaadavum (Religion and Atheism, 1971)
 Matham Thathwavum Prayogavum (Religion - Theory and Practice, 1980),
Swathathrasamaram Nashtappetta Naallukal (Freedom Movement - The Lost Pages, 1982)
Mathetharathwavum Indian Muslimkallum (Secularism and Indian Muslims, 1982)
 Islamum Idamarukum (Islam and Idamaruku, 1982)
 Pravaachakanmaar (Prophets, 1983)
 Shariat Charchakal (Shariat Discussions, 1985)
 Kulambadikal (Translation of an Arabic Novel, 1985)
 Oru Malayali Musliminte Veritta Chinthakal (The Distinct Thought of Malayali Muslim, 2008)
 Aathmageetham (Poetry collection. The Songs of the Self, 2010)
 Muslim Bheegaravadathinte Thayverukal (The Roots of Muslim Terrorism, 2009-An Islamic critique of Islamism, sold 5000 copies in record time)

References

External links

Malayalam-language writers
Writers from Kozhikode
20th-century Muslim scholars of Islam
People from Kozhikode district
Malayali people
1945 births
Living people
20th-century Indian Muslims
21st-century Indian Muslims
21st-century Muslim scholars of Islam